Marissa Janning is a college basketball player who played for Creighton University.

College
Janning was named Big East Conference Women's Basketball Player of the Year as a sophomore during the 2013–14 season.

Creighton statistics

Source

Personal life
Janning's brother Matt has played in Europe and in the NBA Development League.

References

External links
Marissa Janning Basketball Player Profile, Creighton University, News, BEC stats, Career, Game Logs, Bests, Awards - usabasket.com
Marissa Janning Bio - Creighton Bluejays

Basketball players from Minnesota
Creighton Bluejays women's basketball players
Guards (basketball)
People from Watertown, Minnesota